Stranded is a 1916 American silent comedy film featuring Oliver Hardy.

Cast
 Oliver Hardy as Plump (as Babe Hardy)
 Billy Ruge as Runt
 Frank Hanson as Millionaire Slocum
 Ray Godfrey as Slocum's daughter
 Florence McLaughlin as Slocum's daughter (as Florence McLoughlin)
 Robin Williamson as An unwanted suitor
 Bert Tracy

See also
 List of American films of 1916
 Oliver Hardy filmography

External links

1916 films
American silent short films
American black-and-white films
1916 comedy films
1916 short films
Films with screenplays by Anita Loos
Silent American comedy films
American comedy short films
1910s American films